The Cat S50 is a mobile phone introduced in November 2014 by Caterpillar Inc. It runs Android 4.4 KitKat.

It was succeeded by the Cat S60.

References

Cat phone
Mobile phones introduced in 2014
Smartphones